Andesite Vineyard is a Spring Mountain District, Napa Valley vineyard at the 2000-foot level of Spring Mountain, 5 miles up Spring Mountain Road from St. Helena.

Soils
Soil at the top of Spring Mountain is very rocky and excellent for grapes.  Andesite is one of the most abundant volcanic rocks in the Bay Area, and the top of Spring Mountain is primarily composed of Andesite.  The Andesite Vineyard property is the 14-acre heart of the old Robinson property.

Vines
The planted area is a mountain saddle of three acres of Merlot and Cabernet Sauvignon. The Merlot is primarily east- and a bit south-facing; the Cab primarily north and a bit west.

Harvest
Harvest at the top of Spring Mountain is always later than at the Napa Valley floor. Fruit sugar content rises as growing degree days accumulate in September–October. When the grapes are sweet, over 23 °Bx (degrees Brix), the fruit is tasted until the complexity and flavor fully develops and specific vines are selected for harvest. Because this development is not practically measurable, all the premium wine makers here select grapes for harvest by taste. For Andesite Vineyard, every year is different, and after a half-ton is selected, it is harvested and taken to a micro crush facility to be vinified. The minimal half-ton size makes one barrel for aging. Harvest proceeds as the taste fully develops, and is normally complete with six-eight bins harvested over a two-week period.

Wines
Andesite Vineyard's three-acre annual production is about 150 cases.

References 

Wineries in Napa Valley
Companies based in Napa County, California
St. Helena, California